In Turkey, the Directorate of Presidential Administrative Affairs was established following the 2018 parliamentary election after which the Prime Ministry Undersecretariat was dissolved. President of the Directorate of Administrative Affairs is the 'highest-ranking civil servant' in the Republic of Turkey. The first and current president is Metin Kıratlı, who had previously served as the Deputy Secretary General of the President.

Duties 
The duties and powers of the Directorate of Presidential Administrative Affairs are as follows:
 To provide the President with the necessary services in the fulfillment of his duties and exercising his powers, specified in the Constitution.
 The conduct of relations with the Grand National Assembly of Turkey to do the necessary work to ensure coordination among government agencies and institutions.
 To carry out the necessary studies for the determination of the principles that will ensure the State Organization to function regularly and effectively.
 To carry out the necessary studies to ensure coordination in internal security, external security and counter-terrorism organizations.
 To follow up and evaluate the effects of different studies on the public.

List of presidents

References 

Government agencies of Turkey